Senator Peirce may refer to:

Benjamin Peirce (librarian) (1778–1831), Massachusetts State Senate
Clarence V. Peirce (1850–1923), Wisconsin State Senate
Ed Peirce (died 1947), Washington State Senate
Edward C. Peirce (1895–1955), Massachusetts State Senate

See also
William A. Pirce (1824–1891), Rhode Island State Senate
Senator Pearce (disambiguation)
Senator Pierce (disambiguation)